Ceylan Arikan (born 25 May 1971) is a Dutch football manager and former player who manages Abdysh-Ata Kant. He played as a midfielder.

Playing career
Arikan was born in Adana, Turkey. He started his senior career with Galatasaray After that, he played for Sakaryaspor, İstanbulspor, Kocaelispor, Mersin İdman Yurdu, and VV Heerjansdam. In 1994, he signed for NAC Breda in the Dutch Eredivisie, where he made three league appearances and scored two goals.

Coaching career
In January 2009, Arikan was appointed manager of Abdysh-Ata Kant.

References

External links 
 Column - The Dutch School now also in Kyrgyzstan
 Zheilyan Arikan: I am sure we can change a lot
 He waved his hand and said: “I’ll go”
 Debutant Ceylan Arikan scored the last time NAC won at PSV and is still proud
 PSV - NAC in 1995: Turkish one-hit wonder puts Ronaldo in the shade

1971 births
Living people
Dutch people of Turkish descent
Dutch footballers
Association football midfielders
Eredivisie players
Sakaryaspor footballers
İstanbulspor footballers
Kocaelispor footballers
Mersin İdman Yurdu footballers
NAC Breda players
FC Dordrecht players
Dutch football managers
FC Abdysh-Ata Kant managers
Dutch expatriate footballers
Dutch expatriate football managers
Dutch expatriate sportspeople in Turkey
Expatriate footballers in Turkey
Expatriate football managers in Kyrgyzstan